This is a list of Fresno State Bulldogs football players in the NFL Draft.

Key

Draft picks

* Pick was made as part of the original AFL draft to stock the new league.** Pick was made in the regular AFL draft (1961–1966).*** Pick was made in the AFL Redshirt draft (1965–1966).

References

Fresno State

Fresno State Bulldogs in the NFL Draft
Fresno State Bulldogs NFL Draft